Trevathan is a surname. Notable people with the surname include:

Danny Trevathan (born 1990), American football player
Edwin Trevathan, American child neurologist, pediatrician, and epidemiologist

Surnames of English origin